Where's My Water?: Swampy's Underground Adventures is a web series on Disney.com based on the 2011 mobile app game Where's My Water?. It was posted from October 2012 to January 2013 on Disney.com and has also been broadcast on Disney Channel and Disney XD.

Characters

 Swampy is an alligator who lives in the sewers, but unlike the other alligators, he enjoys taking baths. The other alligators like to tamper with his plumbing.  He has a crush on Allie, and tries to impress her. Swampy is voiced by Justin T. Bowler, who also provided Swampy's voice in the game.
 Cranky is the alpha male of the sewer alligators. He dislikes humans, and as a result, dislikes Swampy's human-like bathing, he is also interested in Allie. Cranky is also voiced by Justin T. Bowler
 Allie is a female alligator who perceives Swampy as quirky, but charming and sweet. Swampy and Cranky regularly show affection for her. Allie is voiced by Rebecca Metz
 Karl is a clueless alligator who is friends with Swampy, Cranky, and Allie. He usually does a lot of dumb actions throughout each episode and appears to have a big appetite, as he is usually seen eating many things in the show.
 Pushy and Shovey are an alligator duo who have a personal hatred for each other and they tend to fight each other and misbehave, they occasionally act as Cranky's minions.

In addition to voicing Swampy and Cranky, Bowler also provided the voices of the Karl, Pushy and Shovey in the show.

Production
The series was originally going to be a series of shorts on TV, but was changed to a web series. Production started in March 2012 and the first promo was shown on Disney.com in July 2012. A trailer was published on August 30.

Release
The first episode aired on August 31, 2012 and officially aired on October 5, 2012. It was shown on Disney Channel with Lego's "Friends Of Heartlake City" on October 12. A press release announced the premiere of the series on video.disney.com and YouTube on October 18, 2012.

Episodes

Season 1: 2012–13
The episodes were published on disney.com, then posted to YouTube and made public on Fridays in 2012 and Thursdays in 2013. They were later broadcast on the Disney Channel in 
between other shows. It also started airing on Disney XD on July 13, 2013 as part of Randomation Animation.

References
 Episodes on video.disney.com

 Other references

External links
 

2012 web series debuts
2013 web series endings
2010s American animated television series
American children's animated comedy television series
American flash animated web series
Animated series based on video games
Animated television series about reptiles and amphibians
Animated television series without speech
Disney Channel original programming
Television series by Disney
Works based on video games
Disney Interactive